Favara can refer to:

 Favara, Sicily, Italy
 Favara, Valencia, Spain
 Fabara (or Favara de Matarranya), Spain

People
 Alberto Favara (1863–1923), Italian enthnomusicologist
 John Favara (1929–1980), murder victim